Dipalta is a genus of flies belonging to the family Bombyliidae (bee-flies). The genus is closely related to Villa.

Description
These medium-sized flies, with conical faces, have three marginal wing cells on mottled wings with erratic wing venation. Wing length is 10–13 mm, and body length is 9–10 mm. The species are very variable; Hull suggests there could be other species, or only one very variable one.

Species
D. banksi Johnson, 1921
D. serpentina Osten Sacken, 1877

Distribution
One species is from Mexico and the western United States, and the other from Virginia and Ohio.

Ecology
Adults are found on low growing flowers in desert areas. Larvae are parasitic on ant lions.

References

Bombyliidae
Diptera of North America
Brachycera genera